Fred Bain (1895–1965) was an American film editor. A prolific worker, he edited over a hundred and seventy films, mainly westerns and action films, and also directed three. He worked at a variety of low-budget studios including Reliable Pictures, Grand National and Monogram Pictures. He was sometimes credited as Frederick Bain.

Selected filmography

 Blood Test (1923)
 Midnight Faces (1926)
 The Ramblin' Galoot (1926)
 Overland Bound (1929)
 Untamed Justice (1929)
 Beyond the Rio Grande (1930)
 Westward Bound (1930)
 Firebrand Jordan (1930)
 The Phantom of the Desert (1930)
 Rogue of the Rio Grande (1930)
 Partners of the Trail (1931)
 Quick Trigger Lee (1931)
 The Kid from Arizona (1931)
 Lariats and Six-Shooters (1931)
 Swanee River (1931)
 So This Is Arizona (1931)
 The Cyclone Kid (1931)
 Headin' for Trouble (1931)
 Mounted Fury (1931)
 Human Targets (1932)
 Mark of the Spur (1932)
 The Gambling Sex (1932)
 The Reckoning (1932)
 The Scarlet Brand (1932)
 Devil on Deck (1932)
 The Fighting Gentleman (1932)
 Tangled Fortunes (1932)
 Murder at Dawn (1932)
 The Savage Girl (1932)
 The Penal Code (1932)
 The Man from New Mexico (1932)
 Kiss of Araby (1933)
 War of the Range (1933)
 Marriage on Approval (1933)
 Her Forgotten Past (1933)
 Secret Sinners (1933)
 Rawhide Mail (1934)
 Love Past Thirty (1934)
 Fighting Hero (1934)
 When Lightning Strikes (1934)
 The Fighting Rookie (1934)
 Ridin' Thru (1934)
 Badge of Honor (1934)
 Mystery Ranch (1934)
 Terror of the Plains (1934)
 The Silver Bullet (1935)
 The Laramie Kid (1935)
 Now or Never (1935)
 $20 a Week (1935)
 Unconquered Bandit (1935)
 The Cactus Kid (1935)
 Calling All Cars (1935)
 Tracy Rides (1935)
 Skull and Crown (1935)
 Texas Jack (1935)
 Silent Valley (1935)
 On Probation (1935)
 Wolf Riders (1935)
 Step on It (1936)
 Pinto Rustlers (1936)
 Fast Bullets (1936)
 Senor Jim (1936)
 Desert Guns (1936)
 Headin' for the Rio Grande (1936)
 Santa Fe Rides (1937)
 Trouble in Texas (1937)
 Riders of the Dawn (1937)
 Blake of Scotland Yard (1937)
 Riders of the Rockies (1937)
 Arizona Days (1937)
 Sing, Cowboy, Sing (1937)
 It's All in Your Mind (1938)
 Song of the Buckaroo (1938)
 Starlight Over Texas (1938)
 Frontier Town (1938)
 The Utah Trail (1938)
 Riders of the Frontier (1939)
 Westbound Stage (1939)
 The Pal from Texas (1939)
 Rollin' Westward (1939)
 Man from Texas (1939)
 Straight Shooter (1939)
 Smoky Trails (1939)
 Pinto Canyon (1940)
 Rainbow Over the Range (1940)
 Arizona Frontier (1940)
 Rollin' Home to Texas (1940)
 Roll Wagons Roll (1940)
 Gentleman from Dixie (1941)
 The Pioneers (1941)
 Dynamite Canyon (1941)
 Lone Star Law Men (1941)
 Riot Squad (1941)
 Silver Stallion (1941)
 The Driftin' Kid (1941)
 Wanderers of the West (1941)
 Riding the Sunset Trail (1941)
 King of the Stallions (1942)
 The Panther's Claw (1942)
 Foreign Agent (1942)
 Gallant Lady (1942)
 Where Trails End (1942)
 Arizona Roundup (1942)
 The Yanks Are Coming (1942)
 Wild Horse Stampede (1943)
 Harmony Trail (1944)
 Rogues' Gallery (1944)
 Timber Fury (1950)

References

Bibliography
 Michael R. Pitts. Poverty Row Studios, 1929–1940: An Illustrated History of 55 Independent Film Companies, with a Filmography for Each. McFarland & Company, 2005.

External links

1895 births
1965 deaths
American film editors
People from  Athens, Georgia